On 3 August 1979, Constitutional Convention election was held in Tehran Province constituency with plurality-at-large voting format in order to decide ten seats for the Assembly for the Final Review of the Constitution

It resulted in a landslide victory or the Coalition of Islamic Parties, which all of its candidates won with a wide margin. Unlike other constituencies, the coalition's list of candidates was not dominated by the Khomeinists in the Islamic Republican Party and included four of their moderate rivals. Mahmoud Taleghani, the popular cleric who was endorsed by groups in a wide range of political spectrum, was ranked first and gained almost 80% of votes. Other coalitions including the Quintuple Coalition and the Grand National Alliance were defeated and none of their candidates, exempting those shared with the Islamic coalition, performed well. The former's top exclusive candidates, Asghar Sayyed Javadi and Massoud Rajavi, received no better than 12% of all votes cast.

No secular group was successful and all of candidates affiliated with such parties were defeated. Communist parties like the Organization of Iranian People's Fedai Guerrillas, the Tudeh Party of Iran, the Socialist Workers' Party of Iran and the Laborers' Party of Iran, as well as those of the nationalists such as the Nation Party of Iran, the National Front and the Radical Movement of Iran, all did poor.

Results

By County

Notes and references

Elections in Tehran
1970s in Tehran
1979 elections in Iran